Kakhk (also Romanized as Kākhk and Kākhak; also known as Kākh) is a city and capital of Kakhk District, in Gonabad County, Razavi Khorasan Province, Iran. At the 2006 census, its population was 4,015, in 1,252 families.

geographical location 
Kakhk is located in Gonabad district, its geographical location is as follows: this city is classified as steppe climate with medium latitude at an altitude of 1483.26 meters above sea level. The annual temperature of the region is 17.42 degrees Celsius and 1.01% lower than the average temperature of Iran. Kakhak normally receives about 26.86 mm of rain and has 51.34 rainy days annually.

References 

Cities in Razavi Khorasan Province
Populated places in Gonabad County